Theodor Tirkkonen (6 February 1883 – 24 April 1951) was a Finnish wrestler. He competed in the middleweight event at the 1912 Summer Olympics.

References

External links
 

1883 births
1951 deaths
Sportspeople from Helsinki
People from Uusimaa Province (Grand Duchy of Finland)
Finnish male sport wrestlers
Olympic wrestlers of Finland
Wrestlers at the 1912 Summer Olympics
World Wrestling Championships medalists